Of Thee I Sting is a 1946 Warner Bros. cartoon directed by Friz Freleng, written by Michael Maltese and narrated by Robert C. Bruce that is a parody of World War II documentaries. Material was reused from the Target Snafu cartoon. The short was released on August 17, 1946.

The title is a play on Of Thee I Sing.

Plot
In Target for Tonight-style (a diagram of the target is actually stamped "Target for Tonight" by an officer mosquito), a narrator briefs the audience on a mosquito attack upon a hapless man enjoying a day on a screened porch. It goes from (under)ground school to field training against "enemy" countermeasures such as insecticides and swatters, takeoffs from improvised "aircraft carriers" made from a sardine can with a cigarette lighter as its superstructure and other military weapons.

References

External links
 

1946 animated films
1946 short films
1946 films
1940s parody films
Looney Tunes shorts
Warner Bros. Cartoons animated short films
Short films directed by Friz Freleng
American World War II films
Films scored by Carl Stalling
1940s Warner Bros. animated short films
Films with screenplays by Michael Maltese
Picnic films
Films about mosquitoes